Vladimir Branković (born 22 September 1985) is a Serbian professional footballer who plays as a defender.

Career
During his journeyman career, Branković represented numerous clubs in his homeland, including former national champions Obilić, OFK Beograd, Partizan, and Vojvodina. He also played abroad in three countries, winning the domestic double with Moldovan side Sheriff Tiraspol in 2010.

Honours
Sevojno
 Serbian Cup: Runner-up 2008–09
Sheriff Tiraspol
 Moldovan National Division: 2009–10
 Moldovan Cup: 2009–10
Vojvodina
 Serbian Cup: Runner-up 2012–13

External links
 
 
 

Serbian expatriate footballers
Serbian footballers
Footballers from Belgrade
1985 births
Living people
Association football defenders
FC Sheriff Tiraspol players
First League of Serbia and Montenegro players
FK Napredak Kruševac players
FK Obilić players
FK Partizan players
FK Sevojno players
FK Spartak Subotica players
FK Vojvodina players
FK Zemun players
HŠK Zrinjski Mostar players
Moldovan Super Liga players
NK Vitez players
OFK Beograd players
FK TSC Bačka Topola players
FK Radnički Sombor players
Premier League of Bosnia and Herzegovina players
Football League (Greece) players
Serbian First League players
Serbian SuperLiga players
Serbian expatriate sportspeople in Bosnia and Herzegovina
Serbian expatriate sportspeople in Greece
Serbian expatriate sportspeople in Moldova
Expatriate footballers in Bosnia and Herzegovina
Expatriate footballers in Greece
Expatriate footballers in Moldova